Arber Bellegu (born 11 November 2000) is a German-Kosovar professional boxer and mixed martial arts trainer and manager. Since his debut professional match in 2020, he has won 13 consecutive matches by knockout or technical knockout. As of January 2023, he ranks at #163 at the cruiserweight world rankings.

Early life
Arber Bellegu was born on 11 November 2000 in Schlüchtern, Hessen, Germany. He is of Kosovo descent. He went to school in Wiesbaden and Offenbach am Main. At the age of 10 Bellegu became obese, and doctors recommended him to start practicing sports. He started to train initially in MMA, and then in boxing as a hobby at the age of 13. His trainers included Enriko Kehl and Sheila Gaff, among others. In 2017 he received an injury, which forced him to stop boxing for a while. At this time, he became a trainer and manager in kickboxing, MMA and boxing, becoming one of the youngest trainers/managers (at the age of 17) in the respective sports.

Career
After working as a trainer and manager for 2 years and establishing his training school, Bellegu was persuaded by his friends, family and his manager Avdyl Salihu to get into professional boxing. He made his professional debut on 12 December 2020, winning against Siddarth Pulapalli during a 30 seconds match which ended with a knockout. Bellegu continued his winning streak for 13 consecutive matches, winning against each fighter by knockout or technical knockout. His tenth match against Robin Hardrick won him the World Boxing Council Youth Silver Cruiser Title.

Professional boxing record

References

External links

 on YouTube

Cruiserweight boxers
German people of Kosovan descent
2000 births
Living people
German male boxers
German male mixed martial artists
Albanian male boxers